A pneumatic vehicle may be or refer to:
 Compressed-air vehicle
 Pneumatic tube
 Beach Pneumatic Transit
 London Pneumatic Despatch Company
 Crystal Palace pneumatic railway
 Atmospheric railway